Waterport is a hamlet in Orleans County, New York, United States. Waterport has a post office with ZIP code 14571.

References

Hamlets in Orleans County, New York
Hamlets in New York (state)